Falsification may refer to:

 The act of disproving a proposition, hypothesis, or theory: see Falsifiability
 Mathematical proof
 Falsified evidence
 Falsification of history, distortion of the historical record also known as Historical revisionism
 Forgery, the act of producing something that lacks authenticity with the intent to commit fraud or deception
 Self-falsification, e.g., the Liar's paradox

See also 
 Falsificationism (disambiguation)